Cymbella elegans is a diatom species in the genus Cymbella.

References

External links

Cymbellales